Contactin-4 is a protein that in humans is encoded by the CNTN4 gene.

The protein encoded by this gene is a member of the immunoglobulin superfamily. It is a glycosylphosphatidylinositol (GPI)-anchored neuronal membrane protein that functions as a cell adhesion molecule. It may play a role in the formation of axon connections in the developing nervous system. Several alternatively spliced transcript variants of this gene have been described, but the full-length nature of some of these variants has not been determined.

Genomics

The gene is located on the short arm of chromosome 3 (3p26.3). It is a single copy gene within the Watson (plus) strand, 957,399 bases in length and encodes a protein of  1026 amino acids (molecular weight 113.454 kDa)

Clinical relevance

Abnormal expression of this gene has been implicated in some cases of autism. It has also been associated with cerebellar degeneration in spinocerebellar ataxia type 16.

References

External links

Further reading